Cyana adelina is a moth of the family Erebidae. It was described by Otto Staudinger in 1887. It is found in the Russian Far East (southern Primorye), Korea and north-eastern China.

References

Cyana
Moths described in 1887